Harold Brewer "Cookie" Cunningham (February 4, 1905 – November 3, 1995) was an American professional football player, basketball player, and basketball coach.

A two-sport athlete at Ohio State University, he started playing both football and basketball on the professional level in 1926. He started his professional football career by playing end for the Cleveland Panthers of the first American Football League. After the folding of the AFL, he played the same position for the Cleveland Bulldogs (1927), Chicago Bears (1929), and the Staten Island Stapletons (1931) of the National Football League. In the same five-year span, Cunningham also played center for the Cleveland Rosenblums and the Toledo Red Man Tobaccos (American Basketball League).

Coaching career
Subsequently, he became a basketball coach, first on the collegiate level before becoming a player-coach in the National Basketball League (Columbus Athletic Supply in 1937–38). He subsequently returned to the college ranks, coaching for Washington and Lee University (1939–1942) and the University of North Dakota (1946–1948).

References

External links
 

1905 births
1995 deaths
American football ends
American men's basketball players
Basketball coaches from Ohio
Basketball players from Ohio
Centers (basketball)
Chicago Bears players
Cleveland Bulldogs players
Cleveland Panthers players
Cleveland Rosenblums players
Columbus Athletic Supply coaches
Columbus Athletic Supply players
North Dakota Fighting Hawks men's basketball coaches
Ohio State Buckeyes football players
Ohio State Buckeyes men's basketball players
People from Mount Vernon, Ohio
Players of American football from Ohio
Player-coaches
Staten Island Stapletons players
Washington and Lee Generals men's basketball coaches